The Kitāb al-Ṭabikh fī al-Maghrib wa al-Andalus fī Aṣr al-Muwaḥḥidīn, li-muallif majhūl (The Book of Cooking in Maghreb and Andalus in the era of Almohads, by an unknown author)
was a medieval Andalusian cook book written in the 13th century by an anonymous author. Translation of this book into English was completed by Charles Perry.

References 

Cookbooks of the medieval Islamic world
Arab cuisine
Culture of Al-Andalus